Subrail Park is a stadium in Labasa (pronounced "lum-ba-sa") on the island of Vanua Levu in Fiji. The stadium owned and managed by Labasa Town Council. The stadium has a capacity of 10,000 people at any event. It is the home for Labasa FC and Dreketi. It also hosts rugby union matches, such as the Colonial Cup and the Digicel Cup.

Sports venues in Fiji